Oțelu Roșu (lit. (the) “Red Steel”; formerly Ferdinand;) is a town in northeastern  Caraș-Severin County, Romania, in the Bistra Valley. It is situated on the national road 68, between Caransebeș (21 km away) and Hațeg. The town administers two villages, Cireșa (Bisztracseres) and Mal (Mál). It is situated in the historical region of Banat.

Geography 
To the south of Oțelu Roșu is a large piedmont of the Țarcu Mountains, locally named Gai. To the north the town makes direct contact with the foothills of the Poiana Ruscă Mountains. Dominant heights are the hill of Ferdinand (overlooking the foundry) and the hill of Chiciura.

Oțelu Roșu is subjected to west European climatic influences because of its altitude and location. The altitude and the neighbouring forests and mountains ensure a mild climate. In the winter, snow may persist as much as two or three months, however the temperatures do not drop too low. In the spring months, especially May, floods are possible due to the melting of the snow in the high areas of the Țarcu Mountains and abundant rains. The most recent flood took place in the year 2000, destroying several bridges across the river Bistra.

History
The first signs of human habitation date from the Paleolithic, in form of primitive tools. Sporadic remnants from the Neolithic age have been found in the neighbouring areas.

During the wars between Romans and Dacians, the Bistra Valley was the route used by the emperor Trajan in penetrating into the heartland of Dacia.  A Roman castrum can be found near the cemetery of Zăvoi (ancient Agnaviae), a settlement close to Oțelu Roșu.

In the fifteenth century, during medieval times, Oțelu Roșu was mentioned under the name of "Bistra", and later with the Hungarian name of Nándorhegy. After the expulsion of Turks from Banat by the Habsburgs, the area was colonised by Germans and the place named Ferdinandsberg after emperor Ferdinand. Also, Italians are brought in to work in metalworking industry. Within the Kingdom of Hungary, the town was part of Krassó-Szörény County from 1881 to 1918. In the aftermath of World War I and the ensuing Hungarian–Romanian War, the Romanian Army entered the town.  Following the Treaty of Trianon in 1920, the northeastern part of the Banat became part of the Kingdom of Romania, and the name of Nándorhegy was replaced with Ferdinand.

After 1947 the name Ferdinand did not please the Communist government, who changed it to Oțelu Roșu ("[The] Red Steel") in order to underline the importance of the town's metalworking industry.

Population

The population was 9,260 in 2011, down from 13,128 in 2002. Causes of this demographic regress are among others the problems of the metalworking industry and the high unemployment, making many young people leave the town and move into regional centers such as Timișoara and other areas of Romania.

92.98% of inhabitants are Romanians, 2.09% Germans, 3.23% Hungarians and 0.86% Roma. After 1989, most of the town's Germans, Italians and Slovaks emigrated. In 2002, 76.7% of residents were Romanian Orthodox, 11.4% Roman Catholic, 4.8% Pentecostal, 4.4% Baptist and 1% Reformed.

Natives
 Adrian Mărkuș

Climate
Oțelu Roșu has a humid continental climate (Cfb in the Köppen climate classification).

Education

The town has two schools, Generală 1 and Generală 3, plus one industrial high school.

References

External links

 www.otelu-rosu.ro

Populated places in Caraș-Severin County
Towns in Romania
Monotowns in Romania
Localities in Romanian Banat